Attimari is a 1981 Indian Malayalam-language film directed by J. Sasikumar, written by P. K. Sarangapani and produced by Pushparajan. The film stars Prem Nazir, Jayabharathi, Sreenath and Mohanlal . The film has musical score by K. J. Joy. The film was a commercial success at the box office.

Plot

Cast
Prem Nazir
Jayabharathi
Sreenath
Mohanlal
Srividya
Thampi Kannanthanam
Balan K. Nair
Kuthiravattam Pappu
T.G Ravi
Prathapachandran

Soundtrack
The music was composed by K. J. Joy and the lyrics were written by Poovachal Khader and Pappanamkodu Lakshmanan.

References

External links
 

1981 films
1980s Malayalam-language films
Films directed by J. Sasikumar